Pir Taj (also Romanized as Pīr Tāj; also known as Pīr Tājī) is a city in Pir Taj Rural District, Chang Almas District, Bijar County, Kurdistan Province, Iran. At the 2006 census, its population was 1,451, in 302 families. The city is populated by Turkics.

References 

Towns and villages in Bijar County
Cities in Kurdistan Province
Azerbaijani settlements in Kurdistan Province